St. Priapus Church, also known as Temple of Priapus, is a North American pagan religion founded in the 1980s that centres on the worship of the phallus.

Formation and tenets
St. Priapus Church was founded in Montreal, Quebec, by D. F. Cassidy and has found a following mainly among homosexual men in Canada and the United States. The church, which is named after the Greek god Priapus, teaches that the phallus is the source of life, beauty, joy, and pleasure.

Ceremonial practices
The phallus is to be worshipped, which can be accomplished by a variety of sexual acts, including group masturbation. Semen is also treated with reverence and its consumption is an act of worship. Similarly, fellatio is strongly encouraged; St. Priapus Church sees it as a commandment, a good deed which has positive effects not just for the recipient but for society in general, a practice facilitating world peace. (Well-fellated men, the church teaches, are less likely to make war.)

Membership
There are nine centres of the church in Canada and eight in the United States. The largest membership of the church resides in San Francisco, California, and it has its headquarters in Montreal.

See also

 New religious movements
 Phallic saint

Notes

References
Andy Nyberg. (1983-09). St. Priapus Church: The Organized Religion. The Advocate, pp. 35–37.

Gay culture in Canada
Gay culture in the United States
Gay men's organizations
International LGBT organizations
LGBT culture in Montreal
LGBT religious organizations
Male masturbation
Masculism
New religious movements
Organizations based in Montreal
Modern pagan organizations established in the 1980s
Human penis
Religious syncretism
Modern paganism in Canada